The Mayor of Pune is the first citizen of the Indian city of Pune. The mayor is the chief of the Pune Municipal Corporation. The mayor’s role is largely ceremonial as the real powers are vested in the Municipal Commissioner.

The mayor is elected from within the ranks of the council in a quinquennial election. The elections are conducted in all 76 regions in the city to elect corporators. The Mayor is generally the leader of a party (or coalition of parties) that has a majority. Currently, the post of mayor is vacant due to delay in election.

List

See also 
 Mayor of Mumbai

References 

 
Government of Pune